LRRR may refer to:
 Land Rover Range Rover
 Laser Ranging Retro-Reflector, used in Lunar laser ranging experiments
 Little Red Riding Rabbit
 Lrrr, a character in the television series Futurama

See also
 LRR (disambiguation)